Paolo Lorenzi was the defending champion but lost in the first round to Alejandro Davidovich Fokina.

Jaume Munar won the title after defeating Matteo Donati 6–2, 7–6(7–2) in the final.

Seeds

Draw

Finals

Top half

Bottom half

References
Main Draw
Qualifying Draw

Città di Caltanissetta - Singles
2018 Singles